Slaughterford is a small village and former civil parish about  west of Chippenham, Wiltshire, England. The village has a crossing point of the Bybrook River. It stands in a wooded valley between Castle Combe and Box.

History
The weavers' cottages have 16th-century origins. The present Manor Farmhouse dates from 1753, and attached to it is a late medieval barn. A small 18th-century brewery, now a house, has a prominent chimney that points to its past.

Slaughterford was a separate parish with its own church until it was merged with Biddestone in 1934. Its population at the 1931 census had been 67.

The National Gazetteer of Great Britain and Ireland (1868) states:

Religious sites

The Church of St Nicholas of Myra is Grade II* listed. Built in the 15th century, it was partly destroyed about 1649 by Richard Cromwell's troops on their way to Ireland, and lay in ruins until rebuilt in 1823. Further restoration in 1883 included tracery for the windows. The tower has a single bell cast by John Rudhall in 1823, and there is a 20th-century sanctus bell. The benefice was united with Biddestone sometime before 1953, and today the parish is part of the Bybrook Team Ministry.

A Quaker meeting house was set up in the village in the 17th century. It became disused and the building collapsed in the 1960s, although the burial ground survives. Among the Quakers of the village were the Cheevers family.

References

External links

Villages in Wiltshire
Former civil parishes in Wiltshire